Alendronic acid/colecalciferol, sold under the brand name Fosamax Plus D among others, is a medication for the treatment of osteoporosis in men or in postmenopausal women.

Alendronic acid/colecalciferol was approved for use in the United States and in the European Union in 2005.

References

External links
 

Bisphosphonates
Farnesyl pyrophosphate synthase inhibitors
Merck & Co. brands